Carl Björling may refer to:

 Carl Fabian Björling (1839–1910), Swedish mathematician and meteorologist
 Carl Georg Björling (1870–1934), Swedish lawyer and professor